Repons Peyizan is a Haitian political party. Michel Martelly was elected President of Haiti for the party at the Haitian general election, 2010–2011. As of 2011 the party holds no seats in the Senate of Haiti, and only 3 of 99 members of the Chamber of Deputies of Haiti.

References

Political parties in Haiti
Agrarian parties
2010 establishments in Haiti
Political parties established in 2010